Mount Hermon is an unincorporated community and census-designated place (CDP) located within Hope Township in Warren County, New Jersey, United States, that was defined as part of the 2010 United States Census. As of the 2010 Census, the CDP's population was 141.

Geography
According to the United States Census Bureau, the CDP had a total area of 0.474 square miles (1.227 km2), including 0.462 square miles (1.197 km2) of land and 0.012 square miles (0.030 km2) of water (2.48%).

Demographics

Census 2010

References

Census-designated places in Warren County, New Jersey
Hope Township, New Jersey